West Northfield  is a community in the Canadian province of Nova Scotia, located in the Lunenburg Municipal District in Lunenburg County. It lies in a drumlinized area along the LaHave River. The loam-textured podzolic soils tend to be strongly acidic and stony. However, favorable drainage and moisture-holding capacity make them suitable for agriculture and forestry. A Christmas tree industry has developed around the community in recent years.

References
West Northfield on Destination Nova Scotia
Soil Survey of Lunenburg County, Nova Scotia

Communities in Lunenburg County, Nova Scotia
General Service Areas in Nova Scotia